Óscar Díaz Asprilla (born 8 June 1972) is a Colombian former footballer who played as a midfielder.

Déaz was part of the Colombia national football team at the 2003 FIFA Confederations Cup where he played in the match against Japan. He also won the 2001 Copa América with Colombia's national team.

References

External links
Colombia Squad Intercontinental Cup for Nations 2003

1972 births
Living people
Colombian footballers
Colombia international footballers
Deportivo Cali footballers
2003 FIFA Confederations Cup players
Categoría Primera A players
Categoría Primera B players
Once Caldas footballers
Deportivo Pereira footballers
Cortuluá footballers
Millonarios F.C. players
S.D. Quito footballers
Deportes Quindío footballers
Boyacá Chicó F.C. footballers
Patriotas Boyacá footballers
2001 Copa América players
2004 Copa América players
Copa América-winning players
Association football midfielders
Sportspeople from Valle del Cauca Department